St. John XXIII Catholic Church is a Roman Catholic parish located in Cedar Rapids, in the U.S. state of Iowa.  The parish is part of the Archdiocese of Dubuque and is located at 8100 Roncalli Dr.  One of the newer parishes in the Archdiocese, it is named after Pope John XXIII.  The current pastor is Rev. Richmond Dzekoe.

History
Blessed John XXIII parish was created on September 3, 2000 in a ceremony led by Archbishop Jerome Hanus, OSB, at a ceremony at Taft Middle School.  The parish was created in response to a growing number of Catholics in the southwest portion of the city, and to provide for people living in surrounding areas as well.

For the first three years and five months, the parish hosted Masses at Taft Middle School.  During this time a combined building with church, school, meeting spaces, offices, and kitchen facilities was designed by Novak Design Group.  The building was built by Kleiman Construction Company.  Archbishop Hanus consecrated the new church on February 1, 2004.  The parish has indicated that they eventually plan to build a larger church structure adjoining the current building in a few years.

They failed to mention plans to merge two parishes and essentially destroy the iconic St. Patrick's Church in Fairfax. The old church was deconsecrated a few months shy of its 100th birthday.

References

External links
 Parish website

John XXIII
Churches in Cedar Rapids, Iowa
Christian organizations established in 2000